Ministry of Statistics may refer to:

 Ministry of Statistics (Pakistan), Pakistan
 Ministry of Statistics & Analysis (Minstat), Republic of Belarus 
 Ministry of Statistics and Programme Implementation (India)
 Statistical Committee of Armenia